Ann Leslie "Lee" Garlington (born July 20, 1953) is an American actress.

Early life
Garlington was born in Teaneck, New Jersey. She spent her teenage years in Wilmington, Delaware.

Career
She has guest starred in a number of notable television series, including The West Wing, 7th Heaven, 8 Simple Rules, CSI: Crime Scene Investigation, Judging Amy, Will & Grace, Matlock,  L.A. Law, The Practice, Quantum Leap, Home Improvement, Boston Legal, Roseanne, Get a Life, Coach, Profiler, Medium, Buffy the Vampire Slayer, Two and a Half Men, Lie to Me and among other series. She also played the part of Kirsten, Rose Nylund's (Betty White) daughter in the final season of The Golden Girls and Ronni, the mistress of Joey Tribbiani's father on Friends. From 2002 to 2005, she had a recurring role as Brenda Baxworth on Everwood. She was one of the stars of the series Lenny.

Garlington also appeared in the sequels to Alfred Hitchcock's Psycho, Psycho II (1983) and Psycho III (1986). She starred alongside Sylvester Stallone and Brigitte Nielsen in the action/thriller Cobra (1986). In Sneakers (1992), she appeared as Dr. Elena Rhyzkov, a Czechoslovakian mathematics scientist, in a scene with Robert Redford.

Garlington was originally intended to play the lead female role in Seinfeld. She was the female regular in the pilot episode, "The Seinfeld Chronicles", playing the waitress Claire at Pete's Luncheonette. When the series was picked up, however, it was decided that having the female lead be from such a different social status compared to the rest of the cast would be unworkable, so the character of Claire was dropped and replaced by Elaine Benes.

In 2021, Lee Garlington worked in the Discovery+ film Candy Coated Christmas.

Awards
In 2018, Garlington received a Primetime Emmy Award nomination for Outstanding Actress in a Short Form Comedy or Drama Series for her role as Darlene in Broken.

Filmography

Film

Television

References

External links
 

1953 births
Living people
20th-century American actresses
21st-century American actresses
Actresses from New Jersey
American film actresses
American television actresses
People from Teaneck, New Jersey